This is a list of magazines and academic journals that focus on numismatics.

Argentina 
 Boletin bimestral - Asociacion Numismatica Argentina
 Cuadernos de numismática y ciencias históricas - Centro Numismático Buenos Aires
 El Telegráfo del Centro : gacetilla del Centro Numismático, Buenos Aires

Armenia 
 Hay dramagitakan handes
 Armenian Numismatic Research Organization

Australia 
 Journal of the Numismatic Association of Australia
 Australian numismatic journal
 The Australian numismatist
 Perth Numismatic Journal
 Journal of the Australian Numismatic Society
 Bulletin - Australian Numismatic Society, Brisbane Branch
 Queensland Numismatic Society magazine
 The South Australian numismatic journal

Austria 
 Mitteilungen der Oesterreichischen Gesellschaft für Münz- und Medaillenkunde
 Mitteilungen der Österreichischen Numismatischen Gesellschaft (MÖNG)
 Mitteilungsblatt - Institut für Numismatik und Geldgeschichte, Universität Wien
 Monatsblatt der numismatischen Gesellschaft in Wien
 Nachrichtenblatt der Österreichischen Numismatischen Gesellschaft
 Wiener numismatische Monatshefte
 Numismatische Zeitschrift (NZ)

Belgium 
 La médaille en Belgique
 Revue belge de numismatique
 Revue belge de numismatique et de sigillographie
 Revue de la numismatique belge

Brazil 
 Boletim - Sociedade Numismática do Rio de Janeiro.
 Boletim de numismatica - Sociedade Numismatica Brasileira
 Revista do Clube da Medalha do Brasil

Canada 
 Behind the MASC - Medallic Art Society of Canada
 Canadian Numismatic Journal
 Transactions of the Canadian Numismatic Research Society

China 
 Anhui qianbi 《安徽钱币》 [Anhui Numismatics] - Anhui Numismatic Society
 Chao piao 《钞票》 [Paper Money]
 Gansu jinrong 《甘肃金融》 [Gansu Finance] - Gansu Numismatic Society 
 Neimeng jinrong 《内蒙金融》 [Inner Mongolia Finance] - Inner Mongolia Numismatic Society
 Qianbi bolan 《钱币博览》 - Shanghai Numismatic Society
 Suzhou qianbi 《苏州钱币》 [Suzhou Numismatics]
 Xibu jinrong 《西部金融》 [West China Finance]
 Xinjiang qianbi 《新疆钱币》 [Xinjiang Numismatics]
 Yunnan jinrong 《云南金融] [Yunnan Finance]
 Zhongguo qianbi 《中国钱币》 [China Numismatics] - China Numismatic Society
 Zhongguo sichao 《中国私钞》 [China Private Banknotes]
 Zhoushan qianbi 《舟山钱币》 [Zhoushan Numismatics] - Zhoushan Numismatic Society

Cuba 
 Boletin numismatica - Museo Numismatico, Banco Nacional de Cuba

Czechia 
 Folia numismatica : supplementum ad Acta Musei Moraviae
 Moravské numismatické zprávy
 Numismatické listy
 Numismatické zprávy
 Numismatický časopis
 Numismatický sborník
 Slezský numismatik

Finland 
 Mitali medaljen
 Mitalitaiteen vuosikirja = Årsboken för medaljikonst
 Numismaattinen aikakauslehti : Finsk numismatisk tidskrift

France 
 Annales du Groupe numismatique du Comtat et de Provence
 Bulletin de la Société Française de Numismatique
 Bulletin - Le Club français de la médaille
 Bulletin du Cercle d'Études Numismatiques
 Cahiers numismatiques : bulletin de la Société d'études numismatiques et archéologiques
 Dossiers de la monnaie
 La gazette numismatique
 Gazette numismatique française
 Le livre des mereils : bulletin du Centre National de Recherche sur les Jetons et les Méreaux du Moyen Age
 Numismatique asiatique - Société de numismatique asiatique

Germany 
 Beiträge zur Münzkunde in Hessen-Kassel
 Berliner Blätter für Münz, Siegel- und Wappenkunde
 Berliner Münzblatter
 Berliner numismatische Forschungen
 Berliner numismatische Zeitschrift
 Blätter für Münzfreunde
 Blätter für Münzfreunde und Münzforschung
 Deutsche Münzblätter
 Deutsches Jahrbuch für Numismatik
 Dresdner numismatische Hefte
 Frankfurter Münzzeitung
 Geldgeschichtliche Nachrichten
 Der Geldscheinsammler : Zeitschrift für Papiergeld
 Glanzstücke aus der Numismatischen Sammlung der Deutschen Bundesbank
 Hamburger Beiträge zur Numismatik
 Medaillenkabinett : Mitteilungen der Deutschen Medaillengesellschaft
 Medaillen Plaketten
 Mitteilungen der Bayerischen Numismatischen Gesellschaft
 Norddeutsches Jarhbuch für Münzkunde und verwandte Gebierte

Greece 
 Nomismatika chronika - Hellenikes Nomismatikes Hetaireias

Hong Kong 
 Hong Kong Numismatic Society newsletter

Hungary 
 Evkönyve / a Magyar Numizmatikai Társulat

India 
 ICCG News : http://iccg.in/newspaper.php  "Indian Coins & Currency Group" ICCG News Numismatic Monthly News Paper of India
 Coin : journal of the Numismatic Society of Calcutta.
 Journal of the Numismatic Society of India - Numismatic Society of India
 Indian Coin Society newsletter
 The Indian numismatic chronicle
 Mudra - Numismatic Society of Calcutta
 Numismatic Digest

Israel 
 Alon - Israel Numismatic Society
 Israel numismatic bulletin
 Israel numismatic journal
 Israel numismatic research

Italy 
 Annotazioni numismatiche
 Atti e memorie dell'Istituto italiano di numismatica
 Bollettino del Circolo Numismatico Napoletano
 Bollettino di numismatica
 Bollettino di numismatica italiana
 Bollettino italiana di numismatica e di arte della medaglia
 Bullettino di numismatica e sfragistica per la storia d'Italia
 Historia mundi : le medaglie raccontano la storia, l'arte, la cultura dell'uomo
 Ieri e oggi : periodico d'informazione sulla medaglia
 Italia numismatica
 Medaglia
 Memorie dell'Accademia italiana di studi filatelici e numismatici
 Rassegna monetaria
 Rassegna numismatica
 Quaderni del Civico museo archeologico e del Civico gabinetto numismatico di Milano

Japan 
 Hōsenka : kosen ga kataru rekishi to bunka - Hadoson Tōyō Chūzō Kahei Kenkyūjo
 Sutsudo senka [Excavated coins] - Shutsudo Senka Kenkyūkai

Macedonia 
 Macedonski numizmatichki glasnik

Malaysia 
 Newsletter - Malaysia Numismatic Society

Nepal 
 Mudrā / Mudraa : journal of Nepal Numismatic Society

The Netherlands 
 De Geuzenpenning : munt- en penningkundig nieuws (1951–1976): https://debeeldenaar.nl/archief.html
 De Florijn (1972–1977): https://debeeldenaar.nl/archief.html
 Jaarboek voor Munt- en Penningkunde (1893–current): https://jaarboekvoormuntenpenningkunde.nl/
 De Beeldenaar (1977–current): https://debeeldenaar.nl/archief.html
 De Muntkoerier: https://www.muntkoerier.com/

Poland 
 Biuletyn / Muzeum Sztuki Medalierskiej we Wroclawiu
 Biuletyn numizmatyczny
 Lodzki numizmatyk
 Wiadomosci numizmatyczne

Portugal 
 Moeda : rivista portuguesa de numismática e medalhistica
 Numismática : orgão informativo do Clube Numismático de Portugal

Romania 
 Buletinul Societătii Numismatice Române http://www.snr-1903.ro/bsnr/bsnr.html
 Cercetări numismatice http://www.cercetarinumismatice.ro/
 Studii si cercetări de numismatică http://www.scnjournal.ro/
 Revista de Cercetări Arheologice şi Numismatice http://rcan.muzeulbucurestiului.ro/
 Monedă si comert în Sud-Estul Europei https://www.brukenthalmuseum.ro/publicatii/04.htm
 Cronica Numismatică şi Arheologică  http://www.snr-1903.ro/cna/cna.html

Russia 
 Memoires de la Société d'archéologie et de numismatique de St. Pétersbourg

Slovenia 
 Slovenská numizmatika

Spain 
 Caesaraugusta : publicaciones del Seminario de Arqueología y Numismática Aragonesas

Sweden 
 Göteborgs numismatiska förenings småskrifter
 Mynt kontakt : Svensk numismatisk tidskrift

Switzerland 
 Schweizer Munzblatter - Swiss Numismatic Society
 Schweizerische Numismatische Rundschau (Swiss Numismatic Review) - Swiss Numismatic Society
 Bulletin de la Société Suisse de Numismatique
 Helvetische Münzenzeitung

Turkey 
 Bülten - Türk Nümismatik Dernegi

United Kingdom and Ireland 
 British Association of Numismatic Societies Yearbook / Cunobelin (1954–1960) - journal of the British Association of Numismatic Societies (BANS)
 The British Numismatic Journal (1903/4–current) - journal of the British Numismatic Society
 Bulletin - Numismatic Society of Ireland
 Cartwheel : journal of the Birmingham Numismatic Society
 CCNB Newsletter - predecessor of Money and Medals Newsletter
 Classical Numismatic Review (incorporating Seaby Coin & Medal Bulletin) (1991–current)
 Coin News (1989–current)
 Coin Hoards - Royal Numismatic Society
 Counterfoil - British Banking History Society (formerly British Cheque Collectors Society)
 The Escallop - Reading Coin Club
 Format (1978–current)
 The Groat : bulletin of the St.Albans & Herts Numismatic Society
 Hamilton's Coin & Medal Despatch (1978–1988)
 Irish Numismatics (1968–1983)
 Journal of the Liverpool Numismatic Society (1873/4–1876)
 Journal of the Oriental Numismatic Society
 KOINON: The International Journal of Classical Numismatic Studies (2018–current) KOINON
 Manchester Numismatic Society Proceedings (1864–1873)
 Manx coin recorder
 The Medal
 Money and Medals Newsletter
 The Numismatic Journal (1836/7–1837/8) - predecessor of the Numismatic Chronicle 
 The Numismatic Chronicle (1838/9–current) - journal of the Royal Numismatic Society
 Numismatic Circular (1892–current) - Spink & Son Ltd
 The Numismatic Gazette (1962–1967) - predecessor of The Numismatic Gazette Quarterly
 The Numismatic Gazette Quarterly (1968)
 Numismatic Quarterly (1881) - predecessor of The Numismatic Magazine
 Numismatic Magazine (1886–1903)
 Numismatic Society of Ireland - Occasional Papers (1965–1988)
 The Numismatist (1889–1890)
 Numismatology (1892–1894)
 Oriental Numismatic Society Newsletter - predecessor of Journal of the Oriental Numismatic Society
 Sacra Moneta - Galata (1981–current)
 S&B's Coin and Medal Bulletin (1991–current)
 Seaby's Coin & Medal Bulletin (1945–1991)
 Seaby's Coin & Medal List (1926–1945)
 Token Corresponding Society Bulletin (1971/3–current) - journal of the Token Corresponding Society
 Transactions of the Yorkshire Numismatic Society

United States
The American Journal of Numismatics - American Numismatic Society
The American Journal of Numismatics, and Bulletin of American Numismatic and Archeological Societies
The Asylum - Numismatic Bibliomania Society
The E-sylum - Numismatic Bibliomania Society
Fun money : the American Play Money Society newsletter
KOINON: The International Journal of Classical Numismatic Studies (2018–current) KOINON
The MCA Advisory : the newsletter of the Medal Collectors of America
Medallic sculpture - American Medallic Sculpture Association
Members exchange - American Medallic Sculpture Association
Proceedings of the Numismatic and Antiquarian Society of Philadelphia
Journal of Early American Numismatics
Colonial Newsletter
Colonial Coin Collectors Club Newsletter

Also 
 Acta numismatica
 Archéonumis : revue de numismatique et d'archeologie
 Archiv für Medaillen- und Plaketten-Kunde : Internationale illustrierte Zeitschrift
 Badge Collectors' Circle newsletter
 The Badger - Badge Collectors' Circle
 Bahia numismatica
 De Beeldenaar : tweemaandelijks tijdschrift voor Numismatiek en Penningkunst
 Boletín del Instituto de Numismática e Historia de San Nicolás de los Arroyos
 Bulletin - Association des Amis du Cabinet des Médailles
 Bulletin -/ Association des Amis du Musée Monétaire Cantonal
 Bulletin de la Société d'étude pour l'histoire du papier-monnaie
 Bulletin international de numismatique
 Bulletin of the Pub Check Study Group
 Cercle : informació numismàtica
 Chopmark News - Chopmark Collectors Club
 The "Conder" token collector's journal
 Counterfeit : journal of the Counterfeit Coin Club
 Courrier numismatique
 Crónica numismática
 Cronica numismatica si arheologica
 The Dud : bulletin of the Counterfeit Collector's Society
 Emblematica : an interdisciplinary journal for emblem studies
 Equilibrium : quarterly magazine of the International Society of Antique Scale Collectors
 Flash medailles
 Gaceta numismática
 Gazetta numismatica
 Hekte : a journal of classical numismatics
 The hobby world : a magazine for numismatics and other hobbies
 IBNS journal - International Bank Note Society
 Journal international d'archéologie numismatique
 The Journal of East Asian numismatics (JEAN)
 Journal of the Civil War Token Society
 The Journal of the Classical & Medieval Numismatic Society
 Journal of the Russian Numismatic Society
 Journal of the Token and Medal Society
 Kunst medaljen : tidsskrift for kunstmedaljesamlere
 Litterae numismaticae Vindobonenses
 The Medal Collector
 The Medallist
 Mélanges de numismatique
 Métal pensant : revue de la médaille d'art
 Mitteilungen für Münzsammler
 Moneta : Meddelanden fran Skånes numismatiska förening
 Monete Antiche : bimestrale di cultura numismatica
 Money trend : internationales Magazine für Münzen und Papiergeld
 Le Moniteur de la Numismatique, de la Sigillographie et autres branches auxiliaires de l'histoire
 Monnaie magazine : lein phare le magazine de l'information numismatique
 Mudra : a quarterly research journal of Coin Study Circle
 De muntkoerier : onafhankelijk maandblad voor de muntverzamelaar in de Benelux = Revue mensuelle de la numismatique = Zeitschrift für Numischmatik
 De muntmeester : tijdschrift van de Diestse studiekring voor numismatiek
 Münzen Revue
 Münzen & Sammeln : Zeitschrift für Münzen, Papiergeld, Orden und Medaillen
 Der Münzen- und Medaillensammler : Berichte aus allen Gebieten der Geld-, Münsen- und Medaillenkunde
 Münzstudien
 News bulletin - Chandrapur Coin Society
 Nomisma
 Skandinavisk numismatik : mynt & medaljer
 Sprawozdania numizmatyczne
 Studien zu Fundmünzen der Antike
 Treasure hunting
 Trident : a journal for collectors of ancient coins and antiquities
 Trierer Petermännchen : Beiträge zur Numismatik und Trierer Heimatkunde
 T'ung pao - Society for Oriental Numismatics
 Whitman numismatic journal

Sources 
 Numismatic Guide to British and Irish Periodicals 1836–1995, by Harrington E. Manville, Encyclopaedia of British Numismatics, Part 2 (Numismatic) (London: AH Baldwin & Sons Ltd, and Spink & Son Ltd, 1997)
 Worldcat Numismatics Periodicals
 Library of the Dept of Coins and Medals, British Museum

 
Numismatic
Lists of magazines
Numismatics